The 1992 French motorcycle Grand Prix was the tenth round of the 1992 Grand Prix motorcycle racing season. It took place on the weekend of 17–19 July 1992 at the Magny Cours circuit.

500 cc race report
Doug Chandler was on pole, from Wayne Rainey, John Kocinski and Wayne Gardner. Kevin Schwantz was on the 2nd row. Kocinski got the lead at the start, but Rainey soon moved into first. Rainey opened a small gap to Gardner, Kocinski and Chandler. Schwantz was down in 8th. Chandler out of the race from 3rd place. Miguel Duhamel was in a battle with Mamola for 7th.
Schwantz: "There were about eight laps to go and I got into this tight right bander, not hot, got the bike set, turning and the front started to push. I just couldn't do anything with it physically to try and to the bike stood back up. I was just hanging off the inside had the thing turned, was already committed with the thing back on the gas when it started to push. I couldn't do anything as far as try to stand the thing up because of my arm, I just didn't have the strength."

500 cc classification

References

French motorcycle Grand Prix
French
Motorcycle Grand Prix